The Rural Municipality of Britannia No. 502 is a rural municipality (RM) in the Canadian province of Saskatchewan within Census Division No. 17 and  Division No. 6. It is located in the west-central portion of the province.

History 
The RM of Britannia No. 502 incorporated as a rural municipality on December 13, 1909.

Geography 
The RM of Britannia No. 502 is bounded by the Saskatchewan-Alberta border/Highway 17 to the west and the North Saskatchewan River to the north. Adjacent municipalities include the City of Lloydminster to the southwest, the County of Vermilion River in Alberta to the west, the RM of Frenchman Butte No. 501 to the north, the RM of Eldon No. 471 to the east and the RM of Wilton No. 472 to the south.

Communities and localities 
The following unincorporated communities are within the RM.

Localities
Ashley
Greenstreet
Hewitt Landing
Hillmond
Landrose
Northminster
Rex
Tangleflags

Demographics 

Attractions 
The RM is home to Sandy Beach Regional Park.

Government 
The RM of Britannia No. 502 is governed by an elected municipal council and an appointed administrator that meets on the second and fourth Wednesday of every month. The reeve of the RM is John Light while its administrator is Dale Crush. The RM's office is located in Lloydminster.

References

External links 

B
Division No. 17, Saskatchewan